Tmesisternus brevespinosus is a species of beetle in the family Cerambycidae. It was described by Stephan von Breuning and  De Jong in 1941. It is known from Papua New Guinea.

References

brevespinosus
Beetles described in 1941